Kotha Reddy Palem is situated in Prakasam district of the Indian state of Andhra Pradesh. It is located in Addanki mandal.

Special Events
15,16 January pongal celebrations...

References 

Villages in Prakasam district